Guy Mangelschots (born 8 April 1941) is a Belgian football manager.

References

1941 births
Living people
Belgian football managers
K. Patro Eisden Maasmechelen managers
Sint-Truidense V.V. managers
K.R.C. Mechelen managers